Tom Corby (born 1966) and Gavin Baily (1970) are two London based artists who work collaboratively using public domain data, climate models, satellite imagery and the Internet. Recent work has focused on climate change and its relationship to technology and has involved collaborations with scientists working at the British Antarctic Survey.

Tom Corby is a Reader in Interdisciplinary Arts at the Centre for Research in Education, Art and Media (CREAM), at the University of Westminster. Gavin Baily is an artist and software developer.

Awards
Their work has won a number of awards including: nomination for the File Prix Lux and the File Electronic Language Festival 2010; the jury nominated award at the 10th Japan Media Arts Festival in 2007; honorary mentions at the Prix Ars Electronica 2006 and 2000; honorary mention: "The Post-Cagian Interactive", "Art on the Net" The Machida City Museum of Graphic Arts, Tokyo and the main festival prize COMTEC ART 1999. In 2000 they were nominated for the "International Media Art Award 2000", at Zentrum fur Kunst und Medientechnologie (ZKM) in Karlsruhe, Germany and were artists in residence at the ICA London 1998.

Exhibitions and Reviews
Corby and Baily's work has been exhibited and featured at the ICA in London, Victoria and Albert Museum, Tate Online, the Madrid Art Fair Arco 2001, Intercommunication Center Tokyo (ICC) and media art festivals including the Inter-Society for the Electronic Arts (ISEA), Transmediale, Urban Screens amongst others. Reviews include: Art Review 2009, 2000, La Republica 2010, The Guardian 2011, Neural (magazine) IT 2009, Art Monthly 2007, Artist Newsletter 2006, De bug magazine 2002.

References

Published writings 

2011: "Systemness: toward a data aesthetics of climate change”, in Far Field: Digital Culture, Climate Change and the Poles (eds), Marsching JD and Polli A., London: Intellect.
2010: “Myriad couplings: toward an information aesthetics of climate change”, media-N Journal, Vol. 7, No. 2, (Spring 2010).
 2008 “Landscapes of feeling, arenas of action: information visualisation as art practice”, Leonardo Vol. 41, No. 5, (October 2008).
 2007: “Cyclone.soc: an Interactive Artwork Visualising Internet Newsgroup Postings as Cyclonic Weather Conditions”, Journal of Visualisation Japan, Vol. 10, No. 4, (2007) 338.
 2005: Corby T. (ed.) Network Art: Practices and Positions, London: Routledge. [Edited volume]
 2003: Corby T. "Gameboy UltraF_uk" Novas Medias (New Medias) Symposium Proceedings 'File 2003.
 2000: Reconnoitre", Net Art Guide, Fraunhofer Institute ?: Stuttgart, 2000, pp. 214–216.
 1997: ICA lecture “Building the Cybercity”, ICA Audio tape, London: ICA;
 2006: “Extra-Ordinary Practices”, essay, exhibition catalogue for Extra-Ordinary Practices: A Retrospective of British Media Art, Kunsthaus Dresden, pp. 53–64.
 2006: “New+Media+Arts: Developments in Computer Based Arts” essay, pp. 167–169 exhibition catalogue for Extra-Ordinary Practices: A Retrospective of British Media Art.

Bibliography 
 R Colson, The Fundamentals of Digital Art, London: AVA Publishing 2007.
 S Shun’ichi, “Cyclone.soc”, Intercommunication, no. 59, winter 07 (Japan), 2007.
 T Baumgartel, Art Meets Media, Adventures in Perception, ICC: Tokyo, (Japan), 2005.
 P Catanese, 'Where have all the video-game console artists gone?” Level Up Conference Proceedings: Utrect University, Netherlands, 2003.
 T Baumgartel, net.art 2.0, Nurnberg: Institut für moderne Kunst, 2002.
 S Albert, “Useless Utilities” in New Media Art: Practice and Context in the UK 1994–2004 (ed) L Kimbell Arts Council England/Cornerhouse, 2004.
 J Rosa Press, “Fire to Start”, Journal de Letras Artes e Ideias, no16 (Italy), 2002.
 M Bittanti “[Fuori gioco]. Sconfinamenti videoludici," in Per una cultura dei videogames. Teorie e prassi del videogiocare, Milano: Unicopli, (Italy), 2002.
 S Healy, “Software triffl Kunst im 'Gameboy_ultraF_uk”, DEBUG magazine no 60 (Germany) 2002.
 T Baumgaertel “Unheil auf dem Desktop”, Telepolis, (German text), [Internet], <http://www.heise.de/tp/deutsch/inhalt/sa/7091/1.html> 2001.
 S Bury "Artists' Books: e books", Art Monthly, Nov. no. 241. 2000.
 T Baumgaertel “Experimental software”, ACOUSTIC.SPACE, no. 3, net.audio
 issue, 2000.
 Stocker G. and Schöpf C. (eds.), Next Sex: Sex in the Age of Procreative Superfluousness, Ars Electronica 2000, Vienna: Springer-Verlag, p. 408, 2000.
 B Weil "Readme.txt Browsing online art. An exploration of various directions in networked art projects" [Internet], Museo de Monterrey: https://web.archive.org/web/20080418013454/http://www.museodemonterrey.org.mx/english/mediateca/tours/docs/weil/index.html> 1999.

External links 
 
 Tate Online: Browser Art
 Atmos: Weather as Media, MIC Toi Rerehiko
 Art Meets Media, NTT Intercommunication Centre 2005
 'Perimeters, Boundaries and Borders' at Folly 2006
 Trigger Game Art 2002
 Tom Corby's profile at the University of Westminster
 Corby & Baily at Rhizome
 Stephen Wilson Intersections of Art, Technology, Science & Culture

Living people
English artists
British conceptual artists
Art duos
1966 births